The 1880 Southwark by-election was fought on 13 February 1880.  The byelection was fought due to the death of the incumbent Liberal MP, John Locke.  It was won by the Conservative candidate Edward Clarke.

The 21st parliament was dissolved some weeks later and a general election was held. Beresford stood down and the seat was gained by the Liberal candidate Arthur Cohen.

References

Southwark by-election
Southwark,1880
Southwark by-election
Southwark,1880